The 1962 Sugar Bowl featured the top-ranked Alabama Crimson Tide, and the ninth-ranked Arkansas Razorbacks.

Setting

Alabama

Alabama entered the contest undefeated and as champions of the SEC.

Arkansas

The Razorback defense held opponents to 62.9 passing yards per game, the third best mark in the nation. The total defense (total yards given up) ranked tenth nationally, yielding only 177.4 ypg. Arkansas had tied for the SWC championship.

Game summary
Alabama scored on a 12-yard Pat Trammell touchdown run, leading 7–0. A 32-yard Davis field goal in the second quarter extended Alabama's lead to 10–0. In the third quarter, Arkansas got on the board following a 23-yard Mickey Cissell field goal. In the end, Alabama's defense proved too much, as they shutout the Razorbacks the rest of the way. Mike Fracchia was named Sugar Bowl MVP.

References

Sugar Bowl
Sugar Bowl
Alabama Crimson Tide football bowl games
Arkansas Razorbacks football bowl games
Sugar Bowl
Sugar Bowl